Pyrausta phoenicealis, the perilla leaf moth, is a moth of the family Crambidae described by Jacob Hübner in 1818. It is found worldwide, including the Americas, Africa, Australia and Asia.

It is a pest of Perilla (shiso), fruit mint (Dicerandra frutescens ) and knobweed (Hyptis capitata). Larvae also feed on Lamiaceae mint plants, such as Hyptis pectina, Coleus species and rosemary.

References

phoenicealis
Cosmopolitan moths
Moths described in 1818
Taxa named by Jacob Hübner